Jacob Allen O'Brien (born September 25, 1984) is an American retired professional mixed martial artist who most recently competed in the Heavyweight division. A professional competitor from 2005 until 2012, he fought for the UFC, WEC, and DREAM.

Background
Born and raised in Indianapolis, Indiana, O'Brien attended Franklin Central High School where he competed in wrestling, football, and track and field. In wrestling, O'Brien was a three-time State Champion as a sophomore, junior, and senior, compiling an overall record of 152-9. O'Brien also earned four letters in football and one in track and field. O'Brien continued wrestling at Purdue University, and after redshirting his freshman year, posted a record of 14-18 in his sophomore season as the starting Heavyweight. However, this would be O'Brien's only year of wrestling at Purdue.

Mixed martial arts career

Early career
O'Brien made his professional mixed martial arts debut in 2005 and compiled a professional record of 7-0 which included a 14-second knockout win in the WEC, before being signed by the UFC.

Ultimate Fighting Championship
O'Brien made his UFC debut at UFC Fight Night 6 on August 17, 2006, against Kristof Midoux and won via TKO in the second round. O'Brien followed this up with a unanimous decision victory at UFC 65 before facing Heath Herring at UFC Fight Night 8 on January 25, 2007. O'Brien picked up perhaps the biggest victory of his career, defeating the PRIDE veteran via unanimous decision (29–28, 30–27, 30–27).

In his next appearance, O'Brien faced former UFC Heavyweight Champion Andrei Arlovski and was handed his first professional loss via TKO in the second round. In his next fight, O'Brien was paired with future UFC Heavyweight Champion Cain Velasquez at UFC Fight Night: Silva vs. Irvin on July 19, 2008, and was defeated again via TKO, in the first round.

After two consecutive losses, O'Brien dropped down to the Light Heavyweight division and faced Christian Wellisch, who was also making his Light Heavyweight debut, at UFC 94 on January 31, 2009. O'Brien won via split decision. In his next appearance at UFC 100 on July 11, 2009, O'Brien faced future UFC Light Heavyweight Champion Jon Jones. O'Brien was defeated via guillotine choke submission in the second round.

Post-UFC
After his departure from the UFC, O'Brien won two fights in independent promotions before being signed by the Japanese promotion DREAM.

DREAM
O'Brien was expected to make his debut with the DREAM promotion on July 10 in a Light Heavyweight bout against former Strikeforce and DREAM Champion Gegard Mousasi at Dream 15. O'Brien failed to make weight, weighing in at 212 lbs therefore was given a 10% purse deduction as well as a yellow card at the start of the fight. O'Brien lost via guillotine choke submission in the first round.

Mixed martial arts record

|-
| Win
| align=center| 15–4
| Miodrag Petkovic
| Decision (unanimous)
| Flawless FC 1: The Beginning
| 
| align=center| 3
| align=center| 5:00
| Chicago, Illinois, United States
| 
|-
| Win
| align=center| 14–4
| James Shaw
| Submission (arm-triangle choke)
| Indy MMA
| 
| align=center| 1
| align=center| 1:06
| Indianapolis, Indiana, United States
| 
|-
| Loss
| align=center| 13–4
| Gegard Mousasi
| Submission (standing guillotine choke)
| DREAM 15
| 
| align=center| 1
| align=center| 0:31
| Saitama, Japan
| 
|-
| Win
| align=center| 13–3
| Toni Valtonen
| Decision (unanimous)
| Fight Festival 27
| 
| align=center| 3
| align=center| 5:00
| Helsinki, Uusimaa, Finland
| 
|-
| Win
| align=center| 12–3
| Dave Hess
| Submission (kimura)
| MMA Big Show: Triple Threat
| 
| align=center| 2
| align=center| 4:24
| Florence, Indiana, United States
| 
|-
|  Loss
| align=center| 11–3
| Jon Jones
| Submission (guillotine choke)
| UFC 100
| 
| align=center| 2
| align=center| 2:43
| Las Vegas, Nevada, United States
| 
|-
| Win
| align=center| 11–2
| Christian Wellisch
| Decision (split)
| UFC 94
| 
| align=center| 3
| align=center| 5:00
| Las Vegas, Nevada, United States
| 
|-
|  Loss
| align=center| 10–2
| Cain Velasquez
| TKO (punches)
| UFC Fight Night: Silva vs. Irvin
| 
| align=center| 1
| align=center| 2:02
| Las Vegas, Nevada, United States
| 
|-
| Loss
| align=center| 10–1
| Andrei Arlovski
| TKO (punches)
| UFC 82
| 
| align=center| 2
| align=center| 4:17
| Columbus, Ohio, United States
| 
|-
| Win
| align=center| 10–0
| Heath Herring
| Decision (unanimous)
| UFC Fight Night: Evans vs. Salmon
| 
| align=center| 3
| align=center| 5:00
| Hollywood, Florida, United States
| 
|-
| Win
| align=center| 9–0
| Josh Schockman
| Decision (unanimous)
| UFC 65: Bad Intentions
| 
| align=center| 3
| align=center| 5:00
| Sacramento, California, United States
| 
|-
| Win
| align=center| 8–0
| Kristof Midoux
| TKO (referee stoppage)
| UFC Fight Night: Sanchez vs. Parisyan
| 
| align=center| 2
| align=center| 0:52
| Las Vegas, Nevada, United States
| 
|-
| Win
| align=center| 7–0
| Pat Harmon
| Technical Submission (rear-naked choke)
| UFL: United Fight League
| 
| align=center| 1
| align=center| 3:46
| Indianapolis, Indiana, United States
| 
|-
| Win
| align=center| 6–0
| Antoine Hayes
| TKO (punches)
| LOF: Legends of Fighting 6
| 
| align=center| 1
| align=center| N/A
| Indianapolis, Indiana, United States
| 
|-
| Win
| align=center| 5–0
| Jay White
| KO (punch)
| WEC 19
| 
| align=center| 1
| align=center| 0:14
| Lemoore, California, United States
| 
|-
| Win
| align=center| 4–0
| Johnathan Ivey
| TKO (punches)
| LOF: Legends of Fighting 4
| 
| align=center| 1
| align=center| N/A
| Indianapolis, Indiana, United States
| 
|-
| Win
| align=center| 3–0
| Anthony Ferguson
| TKO (punches)
| LOF: Revolution
| 
| align=center| 1
| align=center| N/A
| Plainfield, Indiana, United States
| 
|-
| Win
| align=center| 2–0
| Paul Bowers
| TKO (punches)
| IFC: Integrated Fighting Classic 3
| 
| align=center| 1
| align=center| N/A
| Indianapolis, Indiana, United States
| 
|-
| Win
| align=center| 1–0
| Chris Clark
| TKO (referee stoppage)
| MT: Madtown Throwdown 3
| 
| align=center| 1
| align=center| N/A
| Madison, Wisconsin, United States
|

References

External links
 Official Site of Irish Jake
 
 

American male mixed martial artists
Sportspeople from Indianapolis
1984 births
Living people
Light heavyweight mixed martial artists
Heavyweight mixed martial artists
Mixed martial artists utilizing collegiate wrestling
Ultimate Fighting Championship male fighters
American male sport wrestlers